Matt Lee is an American sociologist, criminologist and university administrator at Louisiana State University (LSU). He is currently the interim Vice President for Agriculture and Dean of the College of Agriculture. As a servant leader in higher education, his personal and administrative motto is 'Excellence through Innovation'.

Education and career
Lee received his A.A. degree from Dutchess Community College in 1992, his B.A. from the State University of New York at New Paltz in 1994, and his M.A. and Ph.D. degrees from Louisiana State University in 1996 and 1999, respectively. He attended the Institute for Management and Leadership in Education at Harvard University in 2012. His Ph.D. supervisor was Edward Shihadeh. In 1999, he joined the faculty of Mississippi State University as an assistant professor of sociology, and was promoted to associate professor there in 2003. In 2004, he left Mississippi State to become an associate professor of sociology at LSU with tenure. In 2008, he became a full professor at LSU. He has served as a university administrator since 2010.

Lee’s research and teaching interests are in the broad areas of criminal violence and public health. He has written or co-authored more than 60 peer reviewed journal articles and book chapters, and has received NSF CAREER and SGER grants, Board of Regents Enhancement funds, and research support from other sources. He is an internationally recognized expert on interpersonal violence and community patterns of violent crime, crime in rural communities, the social impacts of disasters, and is most well-known for his scholarly work on civic community theory. He was the lead LSU investigator on the $9 million Consortium for Resilient Gulf Communities, which is a multi-institutional research effort funded by the Gulf of Mexico Research Initiative. In the past he was a scientific advisor and provided public relations support for the Baton Rouge Area Violence Elimination, or BRAVE, program. He regularly served as a media consultant on issues related to crime and violence and the social impacts of disasters for nearly a decade. He has been heavily involved in mentoring outstanding graduate and undergraduate students, including students who have become Ronald McNair and Perkins Fellows, and a Truman Scholar and Ford Fellow. Over the years he has been inducted into numerous scholarly honors societies. Several of his former students are now tenured faculty members and well-respected scholars in the fields of sociology and criminology.

Lee spent 5 years as the Associate Vice President for Research at LSU, where his responsibilities included funding program management, faculty development, research policy development, research communications, and oversight for all federal research compliance efforts. His duties also included overseeing a variety of research centers and institutes.

From July 2015 to July 2021 he served as the Vice Provost for Academic Programs and Support Services at LSU. In this capacity he provided oversight for and facilitated the initiation, continuation, and discontinuation of all academic programs and policies on the LSU A&M campus and the other campuses of the LSU System, and oversaw the administration of a large portfolio of academic support programs and services, several of which received national awards for their exceptional performance. From July 2021 to July 2022 he served as the Interim Executive Vice President & Provost, the chief academic and chief operating officer for the institution. During this tenure the institution set several enrollment records, a new record for research award dollars, and initiated a cluster hire in cybersecurity. In August of 2022, he began his post as the interim Vice President for Agriculture and Dean of the College of Agriculture, supporting the agricultural enterprise which encompasses a statewide extension network, an $85 million dollar research portfolio, and nearly 2000 undergraduate and graduate students.

References

External links

Living people
Louisiana State University faculty
Mississippi State University faculty
Louisiana State University alumni
State University of New York at New Paltz alumni
Year of birth missing (living people)
American criminologists
Dutchess Community College alumni